The 2004–05 Scottish Third Division was won by Gretna who, along with Peterhead, gained promotion to the Second Division. East Stirlingshire finished bottom.

Table

Top scorers

Attendance

The average attendance for Scottish Third Division clubs for the 2004/05 season are shown below:

Scottish Third Division seasons
3
4
Scot